WOLO-TV (channel 25), branded on air as ABC Columbia, is a television station in Columbia, South Carolina, United States, affiliated with ABC and owned by Bahakel Communications. Its studios and business offices are located on Shakespeare Road in Arcadia Lakes; master control is based at company flagship WCCB in Charlotte, North Carolina. WOLO-TV's transmitter is located on Rush Road in unincorporated southwestern Kershaw County, near Camden.

History

Early years
The First Carolina Corporation, a group of local investors, obtained a construction permit from the Federal Communications Commission (FCC) to build a new channel 25 television station in Columbia on June 1, 1961, after applying on August 5, 1960. It would be the second attempt at establishing the channel in Columbia. The first, WCOS-TV, had been the first television station in the state, but it folded in January 1956 when competitor WNOK-TV purchased its business assets.

Construction was in full swing by the summer. The former physical plant of WCOS-TV on Shakespeare Road was purchased for use by the new station, and a new  tower was erected on the site. Broadcasting for WCCA-TV began on October 1, 1961, using the former WCOS-TV facilities and downtown sales offices in the Hotel Columbia.

Bahakel purchase
In 1964, Cy Bahakel bought the station out of bankruptcy and changed its call letters to WOLO-TV, seeking a fresh start. Immediately, work began to add height to the station's tower to increase its coverage area. This ultimately materialized in 1969 as an increase to 904,000 watts, followed up in 1981 by a boost to 3.6 million watts.

The case of WOLO-TV was not unique. Instead of one VHF station in Chattanooga, Tennessee, Bahakel bought three similar UHF stations: WOLO, WKAB-TV in Montgomery, and WCCB in Charlotte—all ABC affiliates at the time, and two of them off the air—in the same year. All three were then upgraded to increase their coverage areas at the same time that the All-Channel Receiver Act meant that all new sets could receive UHF stations; the three stations had become profitable operations by the early 1980s. Cash flow increased fivefold from 1975 to 1979, and the staff tripled in size.

Prior to then, the station had long been plagued by a weak signal. Although it decently covered Columbia and most of its inner suburbs in Richland and Lexington counties, it only provided grade B signal coverage of the second-largest city in the market, Sumter, and was all but unviewable in some outlying areas even after the 1981 power increase. The new tower, in contrast, increased WOLO's coverage by 50 percent, providing at least secondary coverage of 24 counties from Charlotte's outer suburbs to the Pee Dee. It also allowed the station to begin digital broadcasts.

In the fall of 2005, WOLO changed its on-air branding from "ABC 25" to "ABC Columbia"; the move coincided with the return of local news production to the city after three years where the anchors were based at WCCB. Beginning in 2014, WOLO began a major expansion of its studio at Main and Gervais. This included the building of a new weather center and an interview set. During the summer of 2015, the station rebuilt the street-side studio set, incorporating multiple monitors and an improved light-control window system. The graphics and music were revamped in October 2015 when John Farley, formerly of WIS, was announced as the chief meteorologist for WOLO-TV.

In 2002, the station became the second commercial television station in the Columbia market to sign on a digital signal. WOLO's broadcasts became digital-only, effective June 12, 2009.

News operation

For most of its first four decades, WOLO-TV was the third station in what was essentially a two-station market, in large part due to its weak signal. Its local newscasts languished in a distant third place, well behind WIS and WLTX. Despite this, the station was responsible for several firsts in the Columbia area. In 1977, the station hired Elizabeth Snite to co-anchor the station's evening newscasts, becoming the first female news anchor in the market. The next year, it hired the first certified meteorologist in the market, Bob Richards, and introduced the first color weather radar system in the area (in 1978) However, these moves failed to rid WOLO of what The State columnist Doug Nye called an "image of comical ineptness" that stuck with the station for decades. According to Nye, this was largely because Bahakel ran the station rather cheaply; well into the 1990s, it was the only station in the market that did not broadcast in stereo. The station did not air an 11 p.m. newscast until 1991; until then, WIS offered the only late news in the market.

In the second half of the 1990s, the station made several moves, including hiring Jim Blue and Leslie Mattox as its top anchor team, additional morning and 5 p.m. newscasts, and a rebrand as 25 Eyewitness News, to improve its position, However, just two months after hiring Blue and Mattox, Bahakel fired the general manager and news director. WOLO-TV gained a reputation as a station with instability in management and news leadership.

In 2002, Bahakel migrated WOLO's operations—including production of its newscasts—to the studio facilities of sister station WCCB in Charlotte. Newsgathering continued to be based in Columbia, maintaining a news director and three teams of reporters to produce the daily newscasts. With the move, WOLO canceled its weekday morning and weekend newscasts, retaining only the weeknight 6:00 and nightly 11:00 p.m. newscasts, and laid off several Columbia-based employees. This was one of the largest-market examples of "centralcasting" (the practice of housing master control and/or other operations for multiple stations out of one facility) in the United States. After the company's financial picture improved and allowed it to afford more digital conversion costs, in the fall of 2005, Bahakel Communications moved production of WOLO's newscasts back to Columbia, from a new purpose-built streetside news studio located across from the State House in the historic Union National Bank Building.

On August 1, 2011, WOLO restored a weekday morning newscast to its schedule after nine years with the debut of an hour-long program at 6:00 a.m. titled Good Morning Columbia, and the return of a noon newscast. On August 19, 2013, Good Morning Columbia expanded to two hours, with the addition of an hour to the broadcast from 5:00 to 6:00 a.m.

In 2015, the station garnered attention when it first hired popular former WIS anchor Ben Hoover to its evening newscasts in August after his departure from the NBC affiliate back in 2014. In October, former WIS chief meteorologist John Farley was hired to replace Reg Taylor, who retired from television at the end of September. The new anchor team was widely promoted in social media as well as the local newspaper and the South Carolina State Fair. The station launched a new look, music, and a finalized studio for the debut in mid-October, with scenes of the capital city and the State House being particularly prominent in its imagery, tying to its unique location at the intersection of Main and Gervais streets.

Notable former on-air staff
 Bob Richards, meteorologist (1978–1979; died in 1994)
 Rick Leventhal (now at Fox News Channel)
 Leslie Mouton (now at KSAT-TV in San Antonio)

Subchannels
The station's digital signal is multiplexed:

Notes

References

External links
ABCColumbia.com – WOLO-TV official website
MeTVColumbia.com – WOLO-DT4 ("MeTV Columbia") official website

OLO-TV
ABC network affiliates
Heroes & Icons affiliates
MeTV affiliates
Start TV affiliates
Bahakel Communications
Television channels and stations established in 1961
1961 establishments in South Carolina